Plasmodium bouillize is a parasite of the genus Plasmodium subgenus Vinckeia. As in all Plasmodium species, P. bouillize has both vertebrate and insect hosts. The vertebrate hosts for this parasite are mammals.

Taxonomy 
The parasite was first described by Ledger in 1922.

Hosts 
The only known host for this species is the monkey Cercopithecus campbelli

References 

bouillize